Anzor Sharaniyevich Tembulatov (born 8 June 1989) is a former Russian footballer.

Club career
He made his Russian Premier League debut for FC Terek Grozny on 21 November 2009 in a game against FC Kuban Krasnodar.

References

External links
 
 

1989 births
Living people
Russian footballers
Association football midfielders
FC Akhmat Grozny players
Russian Premier League players